Major George Earl Preddy Jr. (February 5, 1919 – December 25, 1944) was a United States Army Air Forces officer during World War II and an American ace credited with 26.83 enemy air-to-air kills (a number that includes shared one-half- and one-third-victory credits), ranking him as the top P-51 Mustang ace of World War II and eighth on the list of all-time highest scoring American aces. Preddy was born and grew up in Greensboro, North Carolina.

Early life
Preddy was born on 1919 in Greensboro, North Carolina, the second of four children born to George Earl Sr. and Clara Noah Preddy. He attended Aycock School and Greensboro High School. Following graduation, he worked at a cotton mill and attended Guilford College for two years, before becoming a barnstormer pilot.

Military career
On September 1940, he enlisted in the North Carolina National Guard and served with the 252nd Coast Artillery Regiment. Preddy attempted to become a naval aviator in the U.S. Navy, but was rejected thrice. As a result, he entered the Aviation Cadet Program of the U.S. Army Air Corps on April 29, 1941. He was commissioned a second lieutenant in the U.S. Army Air Forces and was awarded his pilot wings at Craig Field in Alabama, on December 12, 1941, just five days after the Japanese attack on Pearl Harbor.

World War II

Preddy was assigned as a P-40 Warhawk pilot with the 9th Pursuit Squadron of the 49th Pursuit Group, which provided air defense against Japanese aircraft attacking Darwin, Australia. Preddy claimed two Japanese aircraft damaged over Darwin. He was hospitalized after a midair collision with another P-40, in which the other pilot, 2nd Lt. John Sauber, was killed. After his recovery, he arrived at Hamilton Field in California, looking for an assignment and in December 1942, he was sent to Mitchel Field in New York and later to Westover Field in Massachusetts where he was assigned to the 487th Fighter Squadron of the 352nd Fighter Group, flying P-47 Thunderbolts. In July 1943, the 352nd FG boarded the troopship RMS Queen Elizabeth in June 1943. The group landed in the United Kingdom, and was assigned to RAF Bodney in Watton, Norfolk, under the operational control of the 67th Fighter Wing, VIII Fighter Command.

Preddy flew his combat mission of September 1943 and on October 14, 1943, he took part in the Second Schweinfurt raid, but was forced to turn back from mission along with 196 other P-47 pilots due to near-empty fuel tanks. On December 1, 1943, he shot down a Bf-109, his first aerial victory and on December 22, he led his flight in breaking up an attack by Me 210s against a straggling B-24 Liberator and managed to shoot down one of them and lure the remaining away from the B-24, for which he received the Silver Star.

On January 29, 1944, the 352nd FG escorted a formation of 800 bombers returning after targeting industrial complexes in Frankfurt. Over the French coast, Preddy shot down an Fw-190 but was hit by enemy flak. He managed to fly his P-47 over the English Channel and then bailed out of his aircraft. Preddy's wingman Lt. William T. Whisner kept circling over Preddy and repeatedly radioing his coordinates despite his risk in running out of fuel until air-sea rescue could triangulate the position. A Royal Air Force flying boat arrived and attempted to rescue Preddy, but the rough currents of the sea resulted the aircraft in ran him and almost drowning him. After rescuing him, the aircraft had to be towed to the coast by the Royal Navy, as the aircraft broke one of its pontoons due to currents from the sea.

On April 1944, the 352nd FG converted to North American P-51 Mustangs. Preddy became a flying ace after he shot down two Bf 109s during a bomber escort to Neubrandenburg on May 13. On June 20, while escorting bombers to Magdeburg, he shot down a Fw 190 and shared in the destruction of an Me 410 with another airman.

George Preddy was killed on the morning of December 25, 1944, by friendly fire. As commanding officer of the 328th Fighter Squadron, 352nd FG, he was leading a formation of 10 P-51s. After patrolling for about three hours, they were directed to assist in a dogfight already in progress. Preddy destroyed two Messerschmitt Bf 109s before being vectored to intercept a lone Focke-Wulf Fw 190 strafing Allied ground forces southeast of Liège, Belgium. A US Army anti-aircraft (AA) battery (believed to be part of the 430th AA Battalion, XIX Corps) fired at the  but missed and, instead, hit Preddy's P-51. Preddy managed to release his canopy but was unable to bail out before his aircraft hit the ground at high speed. Although the shallow angle of impact meant the crash was potentially survivable, his wounds from .50-caliber machine gun fire were mortal.

Preddy's brother William, a P-51 pilot with the 503rd Fighter Squadron, 339th Fighter Group, was later buried alongside George at the Lorraine American Cemetery, Saint-Avold, France. William died in what is today's Czech Republic on April 17, 1945, from wounds he sustained when he was shot down by enemy AA fire, while strafing České Budějovice airfield.

Military decorations

Preddy's military decorations include:

  Army Presidential Unit Citation

Memorials
Veterans of Foreign Wars Post 2087 in Greensboro was named after George Preddy, soon after the end of World War II.

In 1968, Business Interstate 85, through Greensboro, North Carolina was given the street name Preddy Boulevard, in memory of both Preddy brothers.

There is a memorial kiosk with video, photos, and models of planes flown by the Preddy brothers at Piedmont Triad International Airport.

Footnotes

References
National Museum of the United States Air Force: Major George Preddy
- website article
- one magazine article
Noah, Joe & Sox, Samuel L. Jr. (1991). George Preddy Top Mustang Ace. Greensboro, NC: Preddy Memorial Foundation. 
Scutts, J. (1994). Mustang Aces of the Eighth Air Force. Oxford: Osprey Publishing. 
- Portrait of the flyer
- more pictures of him
- Raleigh Newspaper Article: Discussion On Renaming of Pope AFB to Preddy AFB
- North Carolina Newspaper Article: Preddy Fighter Ace Legends Live On Through Cousin

External links

The Preddy Foundation

1919 births
1944 deaths
United States Army Air Forces personnel killed in World War II
American World War II flying aces
Aviators from North Carolina
People from Greensboro, North Carolina
Recipients of the Air Medal
Recipients of the Silver Star
Recipients of the Distinguished Service Cross (United States)
United States Army Air Forces officers
Aviators killed by being shot down
Military personnel killed by friendly fire
Aviators killed in aviation accidents or incidents in Belgium
Victims of aviation accidents or incidents in 1945
Burials at Lorraine American Cemetery and Memorial
Recipients of the Distinguished Flying Cross (United States)
Recipients of the Croix de guerre (Belgium)
Grimsley High School alumni